Ferrero (Italian: ,) is a surname of Italian (from Piedmont) and Spanish origin that means 'smith', the person who works with iron, in parallel with surnames like Ferraro, Ferrari and Smith.

Notable people with the surname Ferrero include:
Alfonso Ferrero La Marmora (1804–1878), Italian general and statesman
Benita Ferrero-Waldner (b. 1948), Austrian diplomat and politician
Edward Ferrero (1831–1899), Union general famous for his role in the Battle of the Crater
Giovanni Ferrero (b. 1964), managing director of Ferrero SpA, son of Michele Ferrero
Guglielmo Ferrero (1871–1942), Italian historian, journalist, and novelist
Juan Ferrero (1918–1958), Spanish bodybuilder.
Juan Carlos Ferrero (b. 1980), Spanish tennis player
Lorenzo Ferrero (b. 1951), Italian composer
Martin Ferrero (b. 1947), American actor
Michele Ferrero (1925–2015), Italian chocolate magnate
Michele Ferrero (priest) (b. 1967), Italian Roman Catholic priest and author
Pietro Ferrero (1898–1949), founder of Ferrero SpA, father of Michele Ferrero
Pietro Ferrero Jr. (1963–2011), managing director of Ferrero SpA until his death, son of Michele Ferrero

See also
Ferrero-Biella, noble dynasty
Ferrero SpA, Italian manufacturer of chocolate
Ferrara
Ferraro
Ferrera

Italian-language surnames
Spanish-language surnames
Surnames of Piedmontese origin